Covington County is the name of a couple of counties in the United States:

 Covington County, Alabama 
 Covington County, Mississippi